Langanes is a peninsula in northeast Iceland. The name literally means "long peninsula". It is bounded by Þistilfjörður to the northwest and Bakkaflói to the southeast, while the terrain inland reaches elevations of 200–450 metres (600–1200 feet). The highest point is Gunnólfsvíkurfjall  in the southeast of the peninsula, at 719 m.

The peninsula is composed of late Pliocene-early Pleistocene lavas. Kistufjall  (444 m) is the distinctive tuya (table mountain) volcano that resulted from subglacial eruptions.

Administratively, Langanes forms part of the Langanesbyggð municipality (population 480 in 2008). Virtually all of the population live in the village of Þórshöfn (Thorshofn) on the northwestern coast, which has a small airport. Sauðanes , just to the north of Þórshöfn, has an ancient church which has been converted into a museum. The fishing village of Skálar , on the southeastern coast near the tip of the peninsula, had a population of over a hundred in the early 20th century, but was abandoned by 1946. Other abandoned settlements include Heiðarhöfn , Læknistaðir , Skoruvík , Fagranes  and Saurbær .

A radar station (NATO ID: H-2) was operated in Heiðarhöfn, on mountain Heiðarfjall , from 1954 to 1968 to monitor Soviet activity in the GIUK gap. Nowadays the buildings are difficult to reach and remain in a deteriorating condition, most without windows, abandoned to the elements.

In the spring time (May–June) seabirds (guillemot and kittiwake) lay their eggs in the cliffs at Langanes and for those interested there may be an opportunity to watch egg-gatherers at work in the cliffs. The Langanes peninsula is popular with bird-watchers and holds the third largest gannet nesting place in the world at Stórkarl .

References 
Þistilfjörður, Langanes and Bakkafjörður
Langanes

Peninsulas of Iceland
North Iceland